Bunker Creek is a stream in the town of Durham, Strafford County, New Hampshire, in the United States. It is a tributary of the tidal Oyster River.

Bunker Creek was named for James Bunker, who built a garrison on the creek in the 1650s.

See also

List of rivers of New Hampshire

References

Rivers of Strafford County, New Hampshire
Rivers of New Hampshire